The Orto Botanico delle Alpi Apuane "Pietro Pellegrini", also known as the Orto Botanico di Pian della Fioba, is a nature preserve and botanical garden located at 900 meters altitude in Pian della Fioba, Massa, Province of Massa-Carrara, Tuscany, Italy. It is operated by the town in collaboration with the Università della Toscana.

The garden was established in 1966 for the study of plants indigenous to the Apuane Alps and dedicated to botanist Pietro Pellegrini (1867–1957). It was officially opened to the public in 1981. and, although most of its vegetation is spontaneous, it contains a man-made pond for wetland species, as well as experimental trees, mostly conifers, and a collection of chestnut trees (Castanea sativa) for study and conservation.

Species
Species include: 
 
 Abies alba
 Acer pseudoplatanus
 Alnus cordata
 Cedrus atlantica
 Chamaecyparis lawsoniana
 Cistus salvifolius
 Digitalis lutea
 Erica arborea
 Fraxinus ornus
 Ostrya carpinifolia
 Phyteuma orbiculare
 Pinus nigra
 Pinus strobus
 Pinus pinaster
 Pseudotsuga menziesii
 Quercus cerris
 Sorbus aria
 Sorbus aucuparia
 Teucrium scorodonia
 Alchemilla xanthochlora
 Astragalus purpureus
 Buphthalmum salicifolium
 Carex macrostachys
 Centaurea ambigua
 Dactylorhiza maculata
 Eleocharis palustris
 Eriophorum latifolium
 Globularia incanescens
 Helianthemum oelandicum
 Hypericum coris
 Leontodon anomalus
 Mentha aquatica
 Moltkia suffruticosa
 Myosotis spp.
 Orchis pauciflora
 Polygala carueliana
 Rhamnus glaucophyllus
 Salix crataegifolia
 Santolina leucantha
 Scabiosa holosericea
 Thesium sommieri
 Veratrum album

Fungi include Boletus granulatus, Cantharellus cibarius, Macrolepiota procera, and Russula virescens.

See also
List of botanical gardens in Italy

References
Horti entry (Italian)
Istituto e Museo di Storia della Scienza description (Italian)
Comune di Massa description (Italian)
M. Ansaldi, "Orto Botanico di Pian della Fioba", Comunicazione alla riunione scientifica del gruppo di lavoro per gli Orti Botanici della S.B.I., "I giardini botanici dell'Appennino" (Abetone, 6-7 luglio 1990), "Quaderni dell'Orto Botanico Forestale di Abetone", 1 (1992), pp. 13–15.
G. Ceccolini, A. Cenerini, B. Anselmi, Parchi e Aree protette della Toscana, Guida, Roccastrada (GR), Editrice "il mio Amico", 2000 (2 ed.), pp. 242–251.
E. Dolci, Guida ai musei di Massa Carrara, Massa, Provincia di Massa-Carrara, 2002, pp. 57–66.
D. Marchetti, G. Monti, E. Uzzo, Guida dell'Orto Botanico delle Alpi Apuane "Pietro Pellegrini", Pisa, Pacini Editore, 1979.
G. Monti, "Il Giardino Botanico 'P. Pellegrini'", in F.M. Raimondo (ed), Orti Botanici, Giardini Alpini, Arboreti Italiani, Palermo, Ed. Grifo, 1992, pp. 437–442.
Guida agli Orti Botanici della Toscana, Firenze, Regione Toscana, 1992, pp. 63–69.
Giardini e ville di Toscana, Milano-Firenze, Touring Club Italiano – Regione Toscana, 2003, p. 108.

Botanical gardens in Italy
Massa
Gardens in Tuscany